HMS Tiger Bay was a Z-28-class patrol boat operated by the British Royal Navy, previously the Argentine Coast Guard vessel PNA Islas Malvinas (GC-82), which was seized at Port Stanley by the crew of  on 14 June 1982 following the Argentine surrender during the Falklands War.

Operational history

Islas Malvinas was one of 20 vessels of the class built for Argentina by Blohm + Voss of Hamburg, Germany, all of which entered service in 1978.

Following the invasion of the Falkland Islands on 2 April 1982, Islas Malvinas and her sister ship Rio Iguazú, sailed from Puerto Nuevo, Buenos Aires, on 6 April, with stops to take on fuel and supplies at Puerto Madryn and Puerto Deseado. The next day they were repainted from white to brown and green camouflage colours.

Islas Malvinas was employed in various tasks, including reconnaissance patrols, radar sweeps, search and rescue missions, and piloting vessels entering Stanley Harbour. She also acted as an escort to supply ships sailing to remote military outposts. On 30 April she developed a fault on one propeller shaft, which cut her speed by half, but continued to operate.

On 1 May, while escorting the supply ship ARA Forrest off Kidney Island, she engaged a British Lynx HAS.2 helicopter from the frigate . One crewman, Corporal Antonio Grigolato, was wounded by shrapnel before the helicopter retired, having been damaged by machine gun fire from Forrest, receiving hits in the engine, fuselage, fuel tank, tail rotor and cockpit.

She originally had a tripod mast which she lost whilst transporting wounded to hospital ship Uganda in moderate swells. Ugandas bottom rose up and sat on top of the upper-structure crushing down the mast. The mast was not replaced. She acted as a courier for those ashore by ferrying from supply ships at anchor essential needs to landborne service men stationed at various parts of the islands. The RN crew had not been long on board when they found that the departing Argentine crew had left a welcoming present, mainly in the aft deck ammunition locker, booby-trapped with explosives. Information came to hand that the Argentine engineer had organised this before he was taken off the vessel. He was, much to his dislike, obtained and brought back to the vessel to disarm the bomb.

Even though hostilities had ended, Tiger Bay and her RN crew came under fire on a few occasions whilst underway around the Falklands, from Argentines (who had yet to be rounded-up) and by overzealous British soldiers who were not aware that she was now manned by British naval personnel. She was eventually transported to HMNB Portsmouth, and was eventually sold in June 1986.

Legacy 
A name board from Islas Malvinas, which had been presented to Royal Marine Colonel Ian Baxter, was sold at auction in 2009 for more than £5,000, ten times its estimated value.

References 

1978 ships
Ships built in Hamburg
Islas Malvinas GC82
Islas Malvinas GC82
HMS Cardiff (D108)
Captured ships
Patrol vessels of the Royal Navy
Falklands War naval ships of the United Kingdom